Phidias is a crater on Mercury. It has a diameter of 100 kilometers. Its name was adopted by the International Astronomical Union (IAU) in 1976. Phidias is named for the Greek artist Phidias, who lived from 490 to 430 BCE.

Nearby craters include Balzac to the east and Tyagaraja to the south.

References

Impact craters on Mercury